The statue of George Canning in Parliament Square, Westminster, London, is an 1832 work by Sir Richard Westmacott.

Description and history
The  bronze sculpture depicts George Canning (British Prime Minister during 1827) larger than life size, swathed in a long robe and a cloak, holding a scroll in his left hand, similar to a classical statue of an orator from Ancient Roman, although his legs are covered with modern trousers and he has laced shoes on his feet. The statue stands on a  granite plinth which bears the inscription "GEORGE CANNING".

The statue was first erected near St Margaret's, Westminster, overlooking Old Palace Yard. It was unveiled there on 2 May 1832, five years after Canning's death in office aged 57 in August 1827. The statue was said to be a good likeness, and was based on a bust made by Francis Chantrey for his memorial at Westminster Abbey.

The statue was moved to Parliament Square in 1867, becoming the first statue in the new square as it was laid out.  It stands outside 12 Great George Street, the home of the Royal Institution of Chartered Surveyors, in an area now known as Canning Green.  The statue became a Grade II listed building in 1970.

See also
 1832 in art

References
 Statue: George Canning statue, London Remembers
 Statue of George Canning, National Heritage List for England, Historic England

External links
 
 Statue of George Canning – Parliament Square, London, UK at Waymarking
 Parliament Square statues

1832 sculptures
Canning, George
Monuments and memorials in London
Outdoor sculptures in London
Parliament Square
Sculptures by Richard Westmacott
Sculptures of men in the United Kingdom